American actress Marlee Matlin won a Golden Globe Award for Best Actress in a Motion Picture – Drama as well as the Academy Award for Best Actress in a Leading Role, for her screen debut in the 1986 romantic drama film Children of a Lesser God. At age 21, she is the youngest Best Actress winner and was the first deaf performer to win an Academy Award. Since then, Matlin, who is deaf, has received a number of awards and nominations for her acting work, including two additional Golden Globe nominations and four Emmy Award nominations for her television appearances. In 2009, she received a star on the Hollywood Walk of Fame.

Matlin has also received honors for her public service on behalf of the deaf, including a national Jefferson Award in 1988. Gallaudet University, a private university that focuses on educating deaf and hard of hearing persons, awarded her an honorary doctorate in 1987.

Awards and nominations 

  Academy Awards 

  CableACE Awards 

  Gallaudet University Awards 

  Golden Globe Awards 

  Gotham Independent Film Awards 

  Henry Viscardi Achievement Awards 

  Hollywood Critics Association Film Awards 

  Hollywood Walk of Fame 

  Jefferson Awards 

  Los Angeles Film Critics Association Awards 

  Online Film Critics Association Awards 

  Peoples Choice Awards 

  Primetime Emmy Awards 

  Screen Actors Guild Awards 

  Satellite Awards 

 Utah Film Critics Association Awards 

  Viewers for Quality Television Awards 

  Women Film Critics Circle Awards

See also
 Marlee Matlin filmography
 List of Academy Award records
 List of oldest and youngest Academy Award winners and nominees – Youngest winners for Best Actress in a Leading Role
List of oldest and youngest Academy Award winners and nominees – Youngest nominees for Best Actress in a Leading Role
 List of Jewish Academy Award winners and nominees
List of actors with Academy Award nominations

References 

"Marlee Matlin – Milestones". TCM Movie Database. TBS. tcm.com. Retrieved September 12, 2014.

External links
 MarleeMatlin.net > About Marlee > Awards at the Official website
 
 
 

Lists of awards received by American actor